Bomb is an Indian village in Dera Baba Nanak, Gurdaspur district, Punjab, India.

Census 2011 data 

Villages in Gurdaspur district